Manalurpet is a town panchayat in the Tirukkoyilur taluk of Kallakurichi district, in the Indian state of Tamil Nadu.

Geography
Manalurpet is within Tirukkoyilur taluk, which is in the northeastern part of Kallakurichi district. The town is located just north of the Ponnaiyar River, and is along State Highway 9A.

Demographics
In 2011 Manalurpet had a population of 8,523 people living in 1,944 households. 4,256 (49.9%) of the inhabitants were male, while 4,267 (50.1%) were female. 989 children in the town, about 11.9% of the population, were at or below the age of 6. 70.0% of the population was literate, with the male-only literacy rate of 73.3% higher than the female rate of 58.6%. Scheduled Castes and Scheduled Tribes accounted for 11.4% and 0% of the population, respectively.

References

Cities and towns in Kallakurichi district